Medinge is a rural area about two and a half hours' drive west of Stockholm, Sweden, in Arboga Municipality.

Geography of Västmanland County